In mathematics, Sendov's conjecture, sometimes also called Ilieff's conjecture, concerns the relationship between the locations of roots and critical points of a polynomial function of a complex variable.  It is named after Blagovest Sendov.

The conjecture states that for a polynomial

 

with all roots r1, ..., rn inside the closed unit disk |z| ≤ 1, each of the n roots is at a distance no more than 1 from at least one critical point.

The Gauss–Lucas theorem says that all of the critical points lie within the convex hull of the roots.  It follows that the critical points must be within the unit disk, since the roots are.

The conjecture has been proven for n < 9 by Brown-Xiang and for n sufficiently large by Tao.

History

The conjecture was first proposed by Blagovest Sendov in 1959; he described the conjecture to his colleague Nikola Obreshkov. In 1967 the conjecture was misattributed to Ljubomir Iliev by Walter Hayman. In 1969 Meir and Sharma proved the conjecture for polynomials with n < 6. In 1991 Brown proved the conjecture for n < 7. Borcea extended the proof to n < 8 in 1996. Brown and Xiang proved the conjecture for n < 9 in 1999. Terence Tao proved the conjecture for sufficiently large n in 2020.

References 

 G. Schmeisser, "The Conjectures of Sendov and Smale," Approximation Theory: A Volume Dedicated to Blagovest Sendov (B. Bojoanov, ed.), Sofia: DARBA, 2002 pp. 353–369.

External links 
 Sendov's Conjecture by Bruce Torrence with contributions from Paul Abbott at The Wolfram Demonstrations Project

Complex analysis
Conjectures
Unsolved problems in mathematics